Protein FAM122B is a protein that in humans is encoded by the FAM122B gene.

References

Further reading